Nathan D. Abbott (11 July 1854 – 4 January 1941) was an American lawyer from the U.S. State of Maine. He was the co-founder of Stanford Law School, where he also served as its first dean.

Personal life and education 
Abbott was born in Norridgewock, Maine, the son of Abiel Abbott and Sarah Smith Abbot on 11 July 1854. He studied in Norridgewock public schools until the age of 16. That year, in 1870, he moved to Andover, Massachusetts to study at Phillips Academy. After three years there, in 1873 he was admitted and studied at Yale College, where he graduated with a Bachelor of Arts in 1877. At Yale, he was a member of Scroll and Key secret society and Psi Upsilon fraternity.

His legal education consisted of a mixture of reading law at his father's practice in Boston as well as attending Boston University School of Law. He graduated from the latter in 1883 with a Bachelor of Laws (LL.B.). On April 23, 1884 he married his wife, Frances Field.

Career
Abbot practiced law in Boston for about seven years until 1891, when he accepted a position to teach law at the University of Michigan, but held the position for only one year when he resigned to accept a professorship of law in Northwestern University.

After teaching at Northwestern for just two years, in 1895 Abbot was asked to form a Department of Law at Stanford University by its then President, David Starr Jordan. Upon his arrival, Stanford was suffering widespread financial cuts and layoffs as a result of a dispute over the finances of Leland Stanford's estate as well as the economic fallout from the Panic of 1893. Abbot was forced to perform a wide array of unusual duties to begin work on his new law school, including building furniture for the school himself. The law school grew quickly during its formative years, reaching 100 students by the turn of the millennium. The department was also unique in that it accepted students regardless of race or gender; Abbot accepted students who were Hispanic, Chinese, Japanese, and female.

Abbot was a personal friend to famous philosopher William James, who, in fact, was visiting in Abbot's home during the 1906 San Francisco earthquake.

He held that position until 1907, after which time he was a member of the law faculty of Columbia University, New York City. He was a legal scholar of wide reputation and a recognized authority on the English and American Law of Real Property.

Abbot retired in 1922 around the age of 68. He died in 1941 due to complications from Pyelonephritis.

References

Lawyers from Boston
American legal scholars
Boston University School of Law alumni
Yale College alumni
Stanford Law School faculty
Columbia Law School faculty
People from Norridgewock, Maine
1854 births
1941 deaths
University of Michigan Law School faculty
Northwestern University faculty
Psi Upsilon
Maine lawyers